Sápmelaš, originally Sabmelaš, was a magazine written in Northern Sámi that was published in Finland from 1932 to 2001.

History and profile
Sápmelaš was launched in 1932 by Sámi Čuvgehussearvi. The magazine was started as a four-page publication and was distributed to all Sámi households for free. It was financed by the Finnish government until 1995, after which the Sámi Parliament in Finland financed it for 6 years. 2001 saw the magazine fold due to a lack of financing.

The first editors were Paavo Ravila (1934–1943) and Erkki Itkonen (1934–1950). Although neither Ravila nor Itkonen were Sámi, they were both professors of Finno-Ugric languages at the University of Helsinki in Finland. Jouni Kitti served as editor from 1980 to 1998.

References

1932 establishments in Finland
2001 disestablishments in Finland
Defunct magazines published in Finland
Free magazines
Magazines established in 1932
Magazines disestablished in 2001
Northern Sámi-language magazines
Sámi in Finland
Sámi magazines